Arne Hardenberg (born 28 November 1973) is a Danish alpine skier. He competed in two events at the 1998 Winter Olympics.

References

1973 births
Living people
Danish male alpine skiers
Olympic alpine skiers of Denmark
Alpine skiers at the 1998 Winter Olympics
People from Nuuk